Matthias Bühler (born 2 September 1986 in Lahr) is a German sprinter. He competed in the 110 m hurdles event at the 2012 Summer Olympics.

Competition record

References

IAAF profile

1986 births
Living people
People from Lahr
Sportspeople from Freiburg (region)
German male sprinters
Olympic male sprinters
Olympic athletes of Germany
Athletes (track and field) at the 2012 Summer Olympics
Athletes (track and field) at the 2016 Summer Olympics
World Athletics Championships athletes for Germany
German national athletics champions